Members of the Scottish Parliament (MSPs) are entitled to a salary, and where applicable, expenses and allowances.

The Scotland Act 1998 provides for pay and allowances to MSPs, officeholders of the Scottish Parliament and Ministers. The Parliament is required to make provision (by Act of the Scottish Parliament or by resolution of the Parliament) for the payment of:
 salaries and allowances to MSPs and to members of the Scottish Executive (which includes junior Scottish ministers), and
 pensions and the like to former MSPs, members of the Scottish Executive and officeholders of the Parliament.

MSPs are not entitled to any salary or allowance until they have taken the oath of allegiance required by the Act. Once they have done so, they are entitled to relevant payments for the whole period as a member of the Parliament.

History 
In July 1997, the UK Government invited the Review Body on Senior Salaries (SSRB) to set the initial salaries of MSPs, but said that it would be for the Scottish Parliament to determine the allowances to be paid to MSPs. In March 1999, the SSRB published two reports (Review Body on Senior Salaries 1999a and Review Body on Senior Salaries 1999b) and, on 31 March, the Prime Minister  accepted all the SSRB's recommendations as to pay levels for MSPs, officeholders of the Scottish Parliament and Scottish Ministers. He also accepted the arguments for an early review, in 2001, of the levels of pay and allowances.

Initial salaries of £40,092, subject to annual up-rating according to the senior civil service formula, were set established. The Presiding Officer received an additional £33,360 and deputy Presiding Officer an additional £17,305 a year. This remained in force until the Parliament made alternative arrangements (in the 2001 review) for the current salary scheme. Under this scheme, salaries were up-rated annually from 1 April each year using a formula relating to senior civil service salary increases, which in turn remained in force until 1 April 2002 when the Scottish Parliament's own arrangements, conferring the function of setting salaries on the Scottish Parliamentary Corporate Body (SPCB), came into effect.

2001 Review 
In 2001, on the invitation of the then First Minister and the then Presiding Officer, the SSRB again reviewed parliamentary pay of MSPs, officers of the Parliament and Ministers, as well as allowances. The SSRB reported in December 2001 and its recommendations, which were broadly accepted by the four main political parties were as follows:

 MSPs’ salaries should be set at 87.5% of MPs’ salaries at Westminster (recommendation 1)
 there should be no change to the arrangements for the salaries of the First Minister, Deputy First Minister, other Scottish Ministers, the Lord Advocate and the Solicitor General for Scotland (recommendations 2 and 3)
 the officeholder salaries of the Junior Ministers and the Deputy Presiding Officers should be increased to £22,145 (recommendation 5)
 any future adjustments at Westminster should trigger a review of the relevant salaries at the Scottish Parliament (recommendation 7)

The SSRB further recommended that the leader of the next largest non-executive party should get a salary of £32,422 over and above the MSP's salary (recommendation 6). This was not accepted by all the main political parties, with some preferring instead to consider a supplementary allowance to assist all non-executive party leaders (with more than 15 MSPs) in undertaking their duties. The accepted proposal was that leaders of parties with no Scottish Minister or Junior Minister amongst its members should receive a sum additional to their salary (see below). It was also proposed that the leader of the main non-Executive party should receive an additional £32,000. This became the Party Leaders' Allowances Scheme.

Post 2001 Review 
Scottish Parliament Salaries and Allowances was debated in the Chamber on 21 March 2002.

It was argued in debate that because MSPs were uncomfortable about setting their own salaries, the motion for debate provided that the SPCB should decide salary levels for members and ministers and that any future increases should be based on 87.5% of Westminster salaries. It was also recognised that circumstances may change in the future and that the automatic link to Westminster salaries may no longer be appropriate. For this reason the motion provided that the SPCB would be responsible for the review and implementation of future salary levels, having taken, and had regard to, appropriate advice on the matter.

Current salaries 
From 1 April 2020, the salary of a Member of the Scottish Parliament is £64,470. Additional amounts are paid to ministers and officers of the Parliament. Both the Lord Advocate and the Solicitor General for Scotland receive the equivalent of an MSP salary included with their Law Officer salaries.

Allowances 
MSP's are allowed to claim for certain expenses encountered as a result of taking up their position, these include:
Members’ Support Allowance
An allowance of up to £60,700 to cover constituency work including employing staff, running an office and meeting constituents.
Edinburgh Accommodation Allowance
Dependent on the location of an MSP's constituency, they are either entitled to no Edinburgh Accommodation Allowance, £110.47 per night, or an annual allowance of £11,400 (returned Members)/£10,369 (new Members).
Exceptional Needs Allowance/Overnight Expenses Allowance
Up to £98.80 a night is available (£122.83 for London visits) to Members who represent certain constituencies, where it would be unreasonable to expect the Member to return to his/her main or other home before or after undertaking parliamentary duties within that Member's constituency or region
Members’ Travel Allowance
This reimburses travelling expenses at specified rates (car travel 49.3p per mile, motorbike 24p per mile and bicycle 20p per mile) necessarily incurred by that Member within Scotland in performing his or her parliamentary duties. A Member is also eligible to claim 40p per mile (motor travel) for staff employed by them (up to a maximum of 66 journeys).
Family Travel Allowance
Each Member is eligible to claim the travelling expenses of 12 single journeys for each member of his/her immediate family between his/her constituency, region, or main residence and Edinburgh.
Disability Allowances
For a Member with a disability, an allowance up to a maximum of £12,173 per session may be awarded for him/her to use in undertaking his/her work.
Winding Up Allowance
A Member is eligible for this if he/she ceases to be a Member of the Scottish Parliament. The allowance is equivalent to one third of the Members’ Support Allowance payable in any one financial year.

The figures above are for the financial year 2007/8.

Pensions 
Pensions are available to MSP's and specified office holders (including the Lord Advocate and the Solicitor General, but not First Minister or Presiding Officer, where separate arrangements exist). They are paid out of a fund known as the Scottish Parliamentary Contributory Pension Fund, and administered by the SPCB. Participants contribute 6% of their salaries or, where applicable, 6% of a ‘permitted maximum’ salary. Participants can apply for an early pension where they cease to be a contributor because of ill health before attaining the age of 65.

Expenses for 'Non-Executive' parties 
Financial assistance is available for opposition parties "for the purpose of assisting members of the Parliament who are connected with such parties to perform their Parliamentary duties." To be eligible, a party may have no more Ministers or Junior Ministers than one fifth of the total number of Ministers and Junior Ministers within the Scottish Government.

In addition, a Party Leaders Allowance is available to those party leaders of registered political parties with not less than 15 MSPs, excluding the leader of any party which has a Scottish Minister or Junior Minister amongst its members. The scheme provides for reimbursement of specified expenses incurred by a qualifying party leader, the current figures are:

References

External links 
 Scottish Parliament: Allowances 2007/8
 Scottish Parliament: Party Leaders' Allowances Scheme
 Scottish Parliamentary Corporate Body

Scottish Parliament
Public finance of Scotland
Salaries of office-holders
Members of Scottish Parliament